Lemon duck or ningmeng ya is a specialty dish of the Wuming district, Nanning, Guangxi. The sour preserved lemon peel and other sour preserved ingredients used are a common feature of the cooking of the Zhuang minority who live in Guangxi. Lemon is otherwise not commonly used in Chinese cuisine. The flavor is described as 'hot and sour'.

See also
 List of duck dishes
 Zhuang people

References

Guangxi cuisine
Chinese cuisine
Duck dishes
Zhuang people